William Alexander (1841 – 11 May 1904) was a Scottish architect, prominent in the late 19th century. His design genre mainly included tenement buildings and theatres, and he was focussed almost exclusively in the Tayside region. Several of the structures he built or worked on are today listed as Category A, Category B or Category C.

Early life
Alexander was born in Dundee in 1841, the son of Charles Alexander, proprietor of the Dundee Courier.

Career
Alexander was articled to brothers James and William McLaren. After spending time in Edinburgh, he set up business, back in his hometown, around 1865. By 1876, he had offices at 36 North Lindsay Street.

He was appointed Dundee City Architect in 1871 or 1872, beating James McLaren by five votes, after the death of William Scott. He remained in the role for over thirty years, until his death in 1904. He was succeeded after death by James Thomson.

Selected notable works
The below are some of the structures built by Alexander; he altered or made additions to many more.

Salem Chapel, Dundee (1872) – now Category C listed
Victoria Chambers, Dundee (1874) – now Category B listed
Park Brewery, Dundee (1881)
Albert Institute, Dundee (1887) – now Category A listed; Alexander designed the Eastern Galleries and its Victoria Jubilee Gardens
Perth Theatre (1900), now Category B listed

Personal life
In his later years, Alexander was described as being "a big heavy man and latterly somewhat lame".

Death
Alexander died on 11 May 1904, aged about 63.

References

1841 births
1904 deaths
People from Dundee
19th-century Scottish architects
20th-century Scottish architects